The Institute of Forest of the Siberian Division of the Russian Academy of Sciences is the first academic institution of a forest profile in Russia. It was founded in 1944 in Moscow by an outstanding native biologist academician Vladimir Nikolayevich Sukachev. The institute was named after him in 1967. In 1959 the Institute was assigned to the Siberian Division of the Academy of Sciences of the USSR and transferred to Krasnoyarsk.

History
In various years the Institute was headed by academicians V.N.Sukachev (1944-1959), A.B.Zhukov (1959-1977), and A.S.Isayev (1977-1988). Since 1994 the Institute has been headed by academician Y.A.Vaganov. The Institute of Forest  is the largest forest-biologic institution in the Russian Academy of Sciences. Its staff  consists of 170 scientific researchers, 1 academician, 33 doctors and 95 candidates of sciences including. Among them there are 3 Honoured Scientists of the Russian Federation and 4 Honoured Foresters of the Russian Federation. More than 60 people  take a Ph.D. course simultaneously in a number of forest specialties: forest science, forestry, forest management, forest taxation, sylvicultures, forest pyrology, genetics and selection, ecology, botany, forest soil science, entomology, microbiology, physiology and biochemistry of wood plants, and bioinformatics.  From 1947 to 2003 at the Institute 140 prominent native foresters have defended their doctor’s theses. A part of them were then elected members of the Russian Academy of Sciences.

Since 1947 the Institute has been a collective member of the International Union of Forest Research Institutions, and  since 1991 it has entered the International Association of Boreal Forest Researchers.

The library of the Institute is a depository of scientific literature on the forest themes for the regions of Siberia and Far East. It makes up more than 150 units of storage. The readers of the library (550 people) are not only employees of the Institute but also lecturers, Ph.D. students, and university students.

Academics
The structure of the Institute (4 departments, 10 laboratories and a branch in Novosibirsk) provides development of fundamental and applied research in a wide range: biospherical role, ecologic functions and biodiversity of forest ecosystems, monitoring of their condition, and rational use of forest resources.

The scientific schools formed at the Institute: taiga forestry and productivity of forests, permafrost forestry, taxation and forest exploitation, forest morphology, cartography, aerospace information usage, forest genetics and selection, pyrology, zoology, microbiology, physiology and biochemistry of wood plants, dendrology and dendroclimatology and other spheres of forest biological science are the basis for mutual investigations with the scientists of the United States, Canada, England, Germany, Italy, Switzerland, Belarus, Sweden, Norway, Finland, Japan, China, Korea, Mongolia. In 1992 there has been founded Siberian international center of ecological investigations of boreal forests which favours the participation of employees in foreign grants, projects, programs including the problems of climate changes, atmosphere gas composition and biodiversity.

In different landscape-ecological conditions on the territory of Siberia a net of basic research points (stationaries) to carry out experimental work and durable monitoring of forest ecosystems function was created.

Availability of experts of various profiles at the Institute makes it possible to estimate scientific and applied forest problems. So, in the 1960s a complex research of mountain Siberian pine forests of Siberia was finished by development of “Instructions” on forest management in them.

In it for the first time the primary significance of forestforming functions of this forest formation and their hydrology role in particular was stressed.

In the activities of the Institute a great place is taken by investigations in the forests of  Lake Baikal started on the initiative of academician A.B.Zhukov yet in the early 1970s. The developed approaches regulate exploitation of the region forests. They scientifically ground the monitoring of forest exploitation. It is proved by the regional evaluation scale of reforestation evaluation, by the landscape approach to location of wood-cutting areas and by rating of the technogenic load on the ground. This provides the level of ecological security corresponding to the legislation of the Russian Federation on Lake Baikal protection and UNESCO requirements to the objects of world heritage.

For a number of years the Institute has been developing application methods of information coming from flying vehicles (planes, satellites) to estimate condition of forest cover of taiga zone under the impact of anthropogenic and natural factors. Under the leadership of academician A.S. Isayev in 1970-1980 there was worked out a system of aerospace information analysis. It includes etalon polygons on which on-ground and remote information was compared. Forest territories were differentiation on natural basis, experimental research of interaction of electromagnetic radiations with typical forest vegetation was made. Real expression of these investigations became a thematic cartography of resourcefully perspective single regions, compilation of forest fund maps.

Recently
Continuation of this work nowadays is the development of the technique of woodstand taxation and morphology structure investigation on the basis of laser, digital photo and video survey, digital satellite survey and three-dimensional taxational computer analysis of images. On its basis regularities of taxational structure and dynamics of phytomass in plantations forming after fires and cuttings were found out.

Two receiving and analyzing satellite information stations available at the Institute make it possible to estimate ecological information in real time in the interests of various institutions.

In cooperation with foreign scientists the Institutes is working out the system approach to forest management with the help of GIS technologies and databases characterizing the main components of forest biocenoses.

On the basis of modern techniques of receiving and analysis of scientific information estimation of ecological condition of forests in the zones of huge technogenic impact (oil-gas complex of West Siberia, Norilsk industrial region) is carried out.

In two dendrariums of the Institute for more than 30 years about 450 species, subspecies and forms of trees and bushes from different botanico-geographical regions have been investigated. Their acclimatization, growth and development in new conditions are estimated to select perspective species for planting of greenery in towns and other settlements.

Long-term investigations of Siberian forests are reflected in more than 450 books and collections of papers of the Institute employees. The information about features of forest forming process contained in them is widely used by home and foreign scientists and design organizations. On its basis normative documents (rules, directions, recommendations) regulating the main forest production works in Siberia.

References
Official website

Forest research institutes
Universities and institutes established in the Soviet Union
Research institutes in the Soviet Union
Institutes of the Russian Academy of Sciences
Science and technology in Siberia
Krasnoyarsk
Forestry in Russia
1944 establishments in the Soviet Union